Terry Kershaw (March 9, 1952 - October 28, 2015) was an American sociologist and Professor of Africana Studies at the University of Cincinnati.  He served as a board member of the National Council of Black Studies.

Career 
Kershaw was Chair of Sociology and Anthropology, and the Director of Black Studies at The College of Wooster.

Selected publications 
 "Emerging paradigm in Black Studies" in Africana Studies: Philosophical Perspectives and Theoretical Paradigms, edited by Delores P. Aldridge and E. Lincoln James.  Pullman: Washington State University Press, 2007.

References

External links 
 Faculty Page at the University of Cincinnati
“In Memoriam: Terry Kershaw”. The Journal of Pan African Studies, vol.8, no.9, December 2015, pp.i-ii (http://www.jpanafrican.org/docs/vol8no9/8.9-2-Terry.pdf).

American sociologists
University of Cincinnati faculty
College of Wooster faculty
Black studies scholars
1952 births
2015 deaths